Rafael Núñez Florencio (born 1956) is a Spanish historian, philosopher, and critic.

Works 

 El terrorismo anarquista 1888–1909 (1983)
 Utopistas y autoritarios en 1900 (1994)
 El ejército español en el desastre de 1898 (1997)
 Tal como éramos: España hace un siglo (1998)
 Sol y sangre. La Imagen de España en el mundo (2001)
 Con la salsa de su hambre. Los extranjeros ante la mesa hispana (2004)
 Hollada piel de toro: del sentimiento de la naturaleza a la construcción nacional del paisaje (2004)
 Tierra y Libertad. Cien años de anarquismo en España, edited by Julián Casanova Ruiz (2010, contributor)
 El peso del pesimismo. Del 98 al desencanto (2011)

References

Bibliography

External links 

 
 Academic profiles at Academia.edu and ResearchGate

1956 births
People from Camas, Seville
20th-century Spanish historians
Historians of anarchism
21st-century Spanish historians
Historians of Spain
Living people